Mahmudabad  or Mahmoodabad or Mahmood Abad may refer to:

Bangladesh
 Mahmudabad, a historical mint town and subdivision of the Bengal Subah. It comprises the modern-day Northeastern Jessore and Western Faridpur as well as Northeastern Nadia in India.

India
 Mahmudabad, India, Uttar Pradesh, Sitapur district near Lucknow, Uttar Pradesh, India
 Mahemdavad, Gujarat

Iran

Alborz Province
 Mahmudabad, Alborz, a village in Alborz Province

Ardabil Province
 Mahmudabad, Ardabil, a village in Ardabil County
 Mahmudabad, Khalkhal, a village in Khalkhal County
 Mahmudabad, Meshgin Shahr, a village in Meshgin Shahr County
 Mahmudabad, Namin, a village in Namin County
 Mahmudabad-e Taleqani, a village in Parsabad County
 Mahmudabad Rural District (Parsabad County), Ardabil province

Chaharmahal and Bakhtiari Province
 Mahmudabad, Chaharmahal and Bakhtiari, a village in Kuhrang County

East Azerbaijan Province
 Mahmudabad, Ajab Shir, a village in Ajab Shir County
 Mahmudabad, Kaleybar, a village in Kaleybar County
 Mahmudabad, Khoda Afarin, a village in Khoda Afarin County
 Mahmudabad, Shabestan, a village in Shabestan County

Fars Province
Mahmudabad, Bavanat, a village in Bavanat County
Mahmudabad-e Olya, Fasa, a village in Fasa County
Mahmudabad-e Sofla, Fars, a village in Fasa County
Mahmudabad, Jahrom, a village in Jahrom County
Mahmudabad-e Do Dang, a village in Kavar County
Mahmudabad-e Seh Dang, a village in Kavar County
Mahmudabad-e Yek Dang, a village in Kavar County
Mahmudabad-e Danicheh Kheyr, a village in Khorrambid County
Mahmudabad, Marvdasht, a village in Marvdasht County
Mahmudabad, Neyriz, a village in Neyriz County
Mahmudabad, Poshtkuh, a village in Neyriz County
Mahmudabad, Qatruyeh, a village in Neyriz County
Mahmudabad, Sarvestan, a village in Sarvestan County
Mahmudabad, Bid Zard, a village in Shiraz County
Mahmudabad, Qarah Bagh, a village in Shiraz County
Mahmudabad, Siyakh Darengun, a village in Shiraz County
Mahmudabad, Zarqan, a village in Shiraz County

Gilan Province
 Mahmudabad, Gilan, a village in Talesh County

Golestan Province
 Mahmudabad, Golestan, a village in Minudasht County

Hamadan Province
 Mahmudabad, Kabudarahang, a village in Kabudarahang County
 Mahmudabad, Malayer, a village in Malayer County
 Mahmudabad, Samen, a village in Malayer County
 Mahmudabad, Nahavand, a village in Nahavand County
 Mahmudabad, Khezel, a village in Nahavand County
 Mahmudabad, Tuyserkan, a village in Tuyserkan County

Ilam Province
 Mahmudabad, Ilam, a village in Ilam County

Isfahan Province
 Mahmudabad, Chadegan, a village in Chadegan County
 Mahmudabad, Dehaqan, a village in Dehaqan County
 Mahmudabad, Isfahan, a village in Isfahan County
 Mahmudabad, Lay Siyah, a village in Nain County
 Mahmudabad Rural District (Isfahan Province), in Isfahan County

Kerman Province
 Mahmudabad-e Borumand, a village in Anbarabad County
 Mahmudabad Mazaheri, a village in Anbarabad County
 Mahmudabad, Arzuiyeh, a village in Baft County
 Mahmudabad, Howmeh, a village in Bam County
 Mahmudabad, Bardsir, a village in Bardsir County
 Mahmudabad-e Yek, Kuh Panj, a village in Bardsir County
 Mahmudabad-e Yek, Negar, a village in Bardsir County
 Mahmudabad, Kahnuj, a village in Kahnuj County
 Mahmudabad, Rayen, a village in Kerman County
 Mahmudabad, Rafsanjan, a village in Rafsanjan County
 Mahmudabad, Rudbar-e Jonubi, a village in Rudbar-e Jonubi County
 Mahmudabad, Shahr-e Babak, a village in Shahr-e Babak County
 Mahmudabad, Pa Qaleh, a village in Shahr-e Babak County
 Mahmudabad-e Shakur, a village in Shahr-e Babak County
 Mahmudabad-e Darvish, a village in Sirjan County
 Mahmudabad-e Hoseyn Safar, a village in Sirjan County
 Mahmudabad-e Seyyed, a village in Sirjan County
 Mahmudabad-e Seyyed Rural District, in Sirjan County

Kermanshah Province
 Mahmudabad, Harsin, a village in Harsin County
 Mahmudabad, Javanrud, a village in Javanrud County
 Mahmudabad, Kermanshah, a village in Kermanshah County
 Mahmudabad, Sahneh, a village in Sahneh County
 Mahmudabad-e Gavkol, a village in Sahneh County
 Mahmudabad-e Zardab, a village in Sahneh County

Khuzestan Province
 Mahmudabad-e Gomar, a village in Andika County
 Mahmudabad, Behbahan, a village in Behbahan County
 Mahmudabad, Lali, a village in Lali County

Kurdistan Province
 Mahmudabad, Divandarreh, a village in Divandarreh County
 Mahmudabad, Kamyaran, a village in Divandarreh County
 Mahmudabad, Saqqez, a village in Saqqez County
 Mahmudabad, Sarvabad, a village in Sarvabad County

Lorestan Province
 Mahmudabad, Lorestan, a village in Lorestan Province
 Mahmudabad Shahab, a village in Lorestan Province

Markazi Province
 Mahmudabad, Salehan, a village in Khomeyn County
 Mahmudabad, Komijan, a village in Komijan County
 Mahmudabad, Saveh, a village in Saveh County
 Mahmudabad, Shazand, a village in Shazand County

Mazandaran Province
 Mahmudabad, Mazandaran, a city in Mazandaran Province
 Mahmudabad, Babol, a village in Babol County

Qazvin Province
 Mahmudabad, Abyek, a village in Abyek County, Qazvin Province
 Mahmudabad, Avaj, a village in Buin Zahra County, Qazvin Province
 Mahmudabad, Qazvin, a village in Qazvin County, Qazvin Province
 Mahmudabad, Shal, a village in Buin Zahra County, Qazvin Province
 Mahmudabad, Takestan, a village in Takestan County, Qazvin Province
 Mahmudabad-e Alam Khani, a village in Qazvin County, Qazvin Province
 Mahmudabad Nemuneh, a city in Qazvin Province

Qom Province
 Mahmudabad, Qom, in Qom Province

Razavi Khorasan Province
 Mahmudabad, Nishapur, a village in Nishapur County
 Mahmudabad-e Fazl, a village in Nishapur County
 Mahmudabad, Torbat-e Heydarieh, a village in Torbat-e Heydarieh County
 Mahmudabad, Jolgeh Rokh, a village in Torbat-e Heydarieh County
 Mahmudabad-e Olya, Razavi Khorasan, a village in Torbat-e Jam County

Semnan Province
Mahmudabad-e Mowquf, a village in Garmsar County
Mahmudabad, Semnan, a village in Semnan County

Sistan and Baluchestan Province
 Mahmudabad-e Garvas Bakam, a village in Dalgan County
 Mahmudabad, Irandegan, a village in Khash County

South Khorasan Province
 Mahmudabad, Birjand, a village in Birjand County
 Mahmudabad, Darmian, a village in Darmian County
 Mahmudabad, Khusf, a village in Khusf County
 Mahmudabad, Qaen, a village in Qaen County

Tehran Province
 Mahmudabad, Firuzkuh, a village in Firuzkuh County
 Mahmudabad, Malard, a village in Malard County
 Mahmudabad, Qaleh Now, a village in Rey County
 Mahmudabad-e Khalajabad, a village in Shahriar County
 Mahmudabad-e Khalaseh, a village in Pakdasht County
 Mahmudabad-e Kohneh, a village in Pishva County
 Mahmudabad-e Now, a village in Pishva County
 Mahmudabad-e Shotor Khvar, a village in Pishva County
 Mahmudabad-e Tabat Bayi, a village in Qarchak County

West Azerbaijan Province
 Mahmudabad, West Azerbaijan, a city in West Azerbaijan Province
 Mahmudabad, Bukan, a village in Bukan County
 Mahmudabad (36°28′ N 45°35′ E), Mahabad, a village in Mahabad County
 Mahmudabad (36°34′ N 45°35′ E), Mahabad, a village in Mahabad County
 Mahmudabad-e Olya, West Azerbaijan, a village in Shahin Dezh County
 Mahmudabad-e Sofla, West Azerbaijan, a village in Shahin Dezh County
 Mahmudabad, Urmia, a village in Urmia County
 Mahmudabad Rural District (Shahin Dezh County), West Azerbaijan province

Yazd Province

Bafq County
 Mahmudabad, alternate name of Basab, a village in Bafq County

Khatam County
 Mahmudabad, Khatam, a village in Khatam County

Mehriz County
 Mahmudabad, Khvormiz, a village in Mehriz County

Taft County
 Mahmudabad, Sakhvid, a village in Taft County
 Mahmudabad-e Nasri, a village in Taft County
 Mahmudabad, Yazd, a village in Yazd County

Zanjan Province
 Mahmudabad, Khodabandeh, a village in Khodabandeh County
 Mahmudabad, Zanjan, a village in Zanjan County

Pakistan
 Mahmudabad, Karachi a neighbourhood in Karachi, Sindh, Pakistan

See also
 Mahmudabad-e Olya (disambiguation)